My Brother Anastasia (Italian: Anastasia mio fratello) is a 1973 Italian drama crime film directed by  Steno.

Cast 
 
 Alberto Sordi as Don Salvatore Anastasia
 Richard Conte as Albert Anastasia
 Luciano Pigozzi as Pasquale 
 Edoardo Faieta as Sonny Boy 
 Feodor Chaliapin, Jr. as Frank Costello  
 Franco Angrisano as Inspector De Felice

Plot
Don Salvatore Anastasia, a priest in a seminary in Tropea, Calabria (Italy), gets a ticket to visit his brother in New York. He has never known him, because the brother emigrated illegally in the U.S.A. years before.

Upon his arrival in America, he is greeted with much respect, as well as his brother, also from the Italian-American community of Little Italy. Enthusiastic of that, he decided to stay on as assistant pastor in the church of Saint Lucia and bring it to a new shine.

Accompanied in New York, his last name, Anastasia, commands respect and, above all, opens the door hitherto locked: his brother, really, is the infamous mob boss Albert Anastasia.

After the allegations of a clandestine horse race, there is a federal investigation, and Albert, brother of Don Salvatore, is locked up in the prison of Sing Sing and sentenced to 10 months for tax evasion.

Here begins the collapse of Don Salvatore, who will recover only when his brother gets out of jail. But the recovery will be short-lived because Albert dies shortly after, assassinated in a barber salon. Don Salvatore, overcome by grief at the loss of his brother, has no choice but to embark, sadly, and return to Italy.

References

External links

1973 films
1970s crime films
1970s Italian-language films
Films directed by Stefano Vanzina
Italian crime films
Films set in the 1920s
Films set in the 1930s
Cultural depictions of Albert Anastasia
Cultural depictions of Frank Costello
Films scored by Piero Piccioni
1973 comedy films
1970s Italian films